Alexander Kenneth Josef Cudlin is a motorcycle racer from Australia. His elder brother, Damian Cudlin, is also a motorcycle racer. He competes in the Endurance FIM World Championship aboard a Suzuki GSX-R1000.

Career statistics
2003- 2nd, Australian Superstock 600 Championship #52 Yamaha YZF-R6 / 1st, Australian FX Superstock 600 Championship #52 Yamaha YZF-R6
2004- Australian Supersport Championship #52 Yamaha YZF-R6
2005- Australian Supersport Championship #52 Yamaha YZF-R6
2006- 7th, Endurance FIM World Championship #666 Kawasaki ZX-10R
2007- 13th, Endurance FIM World Championship #666 Kawasaki ZX-10R
2008- 22nd, Endurance FIM World Championship #666 Kawasaki ZX-10R
2009- 8th, Endurance FIM World Championship #3 Yamaha YZF-R1
2010- 1st, Endurance World Cup #95 Suzuki GSX-R1000 / 1st, QIRRCH #80 Suzuki GSX-R1000
2011- 11th, Endurance World Cup #95 Suzuki GSX-R1000 / 1st, QIRRCH #1 Suzuki GSX-R1000
2012- 7th, Endurance World Cup #95 Suzuki GSX-R1000 / 1st, QIRRCH #01 Suzuki GSX-R1000
2013- 1st, QIRRCH #01 Suzuki GSX-R1000 / 1st, Le Mans 24 Hours Suzuki GSX-R1000
2014- 1st, Qatar Superbike Championship #1    Kawasaki ZX-10R / 2nd, Endurance World Cup #95    Kawasaki ZX-10R
2015- 1st, Qatar Superbike Championship #1    Kawasaki ZX-10R / 11th, Endurance World Cup #95    Kawasaki ZX-10R
2016- 1st, Qatar Superbike Championship #1    Kawasaki ZX-10R / 3rd, Endurance FIM World Championship #50    Suzuki GSX-R1000
2017- Endurance FIM World Championship #1    Suzuki GSX-R1000

Grand Prix motorcycle racing

By season

Races by year
(key)

Superbike World Championship

Races by year
(key)

References

External links

 Profile on motogp.com

Australian motorcycle racers
Living people
1986 births
Supersport World Championship riders
Moto2 World Championship riders